Sex, Drugs, Rock 'N' Roll & the End of the World  is an American comedy album first released in 1982 by National Lampoon magazine. It was later released as a CD.

Performers included Roger Bumpass, Suzy Demeter, Barry Diamond, Teresa Ganzel, Wendy Goldman, Mike Griffin, Fred Jones, Elizabeth Kemp, Tony Kisch, Jeff Madell, Phil Proctor, Tony Scheuren, and Michael Simmons.

Tracks
 An Introduction
 Annie
 Firing LIne
 Cocaine
 Jane Fonda Speaks Out
 Firing Line 2
 Sushi Riot
 Godspeak Suite: Porkbucket Place
 Godspeak Suite: Born Again Bob
 Godspeak Suite: Godspeak
 Godspeak Suite: My Bod Is For God
 South Bronx is Burning
 Byz Talk
 Abe Schenckle's Rock Show
 Sidewinders
 Byz Talk 2
 A Walk in the Park
 Best Friends
 Mr. Reagan's Neighborhood
 Apocalypso Now!

References

 Amazon listing
 CD universe has cast list
 Allmusic.com has a review

National Lampoon albums
1982 albums
1980s comedy albums